The  poverty alleviation programs in India  can be categorized based on whether it is targeted either for rural areas or urban areas in the country. 

Most of the programs are designed to target rural poverty as the prevalence of poverty is high in rural areas. Also targeting poverty is a great challenge in rural areas due to various geographic and infrastructure limitations. The programs can be mainly grouped into

 Wage employment programs
 Self-employment programs
 Food security programs
 Social security programs 
 Urban poverty alleviation programs
 Skill India programs for employment

The five-year plans immediately after independence tried to focus on poverty alleviation through sectoral programs.

Jawahar Gram Samriddhi Yojana (JGSY)

Jawahar Gram Samriddhi Yojana (JGSY) is the restructured, streamlined, and comprehensive version of the  Jawahar Rozgar Yojana (JRY). It was started on 1 April 1999. The main aim of this program was the development of rural areas. Infrastructure like roads to connect the village to different areas made the village more accessible and other social, educational (schools) and infrastructure like hospitals. Its secondary objective was to give out sustained wage employment. This was only given to BELOW POVERTY LINE families and the fund was to be spent for individual beneficiary schemes for SCs and STs and 3% for the establishment of barrier-free infrastructure for the disabled people.

National Old Age Pension Scheme (NOAPS)
The NOAPS scheme came into effect on 15 August 1995. The scheme provides pensions to all old people who were above the age of 60 who could not fund themselves and did not have any means of subsistence. The pension that was given was ₹200  a month (now it is 2000 per month). This pension is given by the central government. The job of implementation of this scheme in states and union territories is given to panchayats and municipalities. The state's contribution may vary depending on the state.
The amount of old-age pension is ₹200 per month for applicants aged 60–79. For applicants aged above 80  years, the amount has been revised to ₹500 a month according to the 2011–2012 Budget. It is a successful venture.

Sampoorna Grameen Rozgar Yojana
The Sampoorna Grameen Rozgar Yojana (English: Universal Rural Employment Programme) was a scheme launched on 25 September 2001 by the Government of India to gain the objective of providing gainful employment for the rural poor. From 21 February 2003, EAS became an allocation-based scheme.

The Sampoorna Grameen Rozgar Yojana was launched by merging the provisions of Employment Assurance Scheme (EAS) and Jawahar Gram Samridhi Yojana (JGSY). The programme is self-targeting in nature and aims to provide employment and food to people in rural areas who lived below the poverty line. The programme was implemented through the Panchayati Raj institutions.

National Family Benefit Scheme (NFBS)

The National Family Benefit Scheme (NFBS) was introduced by GOI throughout the country in August 1995 with the aim to provide immediate succor to those Below Poverty Line (BPL) families whose lone bread earner expires due to natural or accidental cause.The scheme aims to provide a lump sum family benefit of Rs 10,000/- to the bereaved households in case of the death of the primary breadwinner irrespective of the cause of death. The scheme is applicable to people in the age bracket of 18-64 years.

National Maternity Benefit Scheme
This scheme provides a sum of ₹6000 to a pregnant mother in three installments. The women should be older than 19  years of age. It is given normally 12–8  weeks before the birth and in case of the death of the child the women can still avail it. The NMBS is implemented by almost all states and union territories with the help of panchayats and municipalities. During 1999–2000 the total allocation of funds for this scheme was 767.05  crores and the amount used was ₹4444.13  crore. It is for families below the poverty line. The scheme was updated in 2005-06 into Janani Suraksha Yojana with ₹1400 for every institutional birth.

First instalment (in first trimester of pregnancy) - ₹3,000/-

•  Early Registration of Pregnancy, preferably within the first three months.
•   Received one antenatal check-up.

Second instalment

• At the time of institutional delivery - ₹15000/-

Third instalment (3 months after delivery) - ₹1500/-

•  Childbirth is compulsory to be registered.
•  Child has received BCG vaccination.
•  Child has received OPV and DPT-1 & 2.

Annapurna
The government started this scheme in 1999–2000 to provide food to senior citizens who cannot take care of themselves and are not under the National Old Age Pension Scheme (NOAPS), and who have no one to take care of them in their village. This scheme would provide 10  kg of free food grains a month for the eligible senior citizens. The allocation for this scheme in 2000-2001 was ₹100  crore. They mostly target groups of 'poorest of the poor and 'indigent senior citizens'...

Integrated Rural Development Program (IRDP)

IRDP in India is among the world's most ambitious programs to alleviate rural poverty by providing income-generated assets to the poorest of the poor. 
This program was first introduced in 1978–79 in some selected areas but covered all the areas by November 1980. During the sixth five-year plan (1980–85) assets worth 47.6 billion rupees were distributed to about 16.6 million poor families.
During 1987–88, another 4.2 million families were assisted with an average investment of 4,471 per family or 19 billion rupees overall.

The major objective of the Integrated Rural Development Program (IRDP) is to raise families of identified target group below the poverty line by creating sustainable opportunities for self-employment in the rural sector.
Assistance is given in the form of subsidy by the government and term credit advanced by financial institutions (commercial banks, cooperatives, and regional rural banks.) The program is implemented in all blocks of the country as a centrally sponsored scheme funded on a 50:50 basis by the center and the states.
The target group under IRDP consists of small and marginal farmers, agricultural laborers, and rural artisans having annual income below ₹11,000 defined as the poverty line in the Eighth Plan. To ensure that benefits under the program reach the more vulnerable sectors of the society, it is stipulated that at least 50 percent of assisted families should be from scheduled castes and scheduled tribes with a corresponding flow of resources to them. Furthermore, 40 percent of the coverage should be of women beneficiaries and 3 percent of physically challenged persons.
At the grassroots level, the block staff is responsible for the implementation of the program. The State Level Coordination Committee (SLCC) monitors the program at the state level whereas the Ministry of Rural Areas and Employment is responsible for the release of central share of funds, policy formation, overall guidance, monitoring, and evaluation of the program.

Pradhan Mantri Gramin Awaas Yojana

This scheme aimed at creating housing for everyone. It was initiated in 1985. It aimed at creating 20  lakh housing units out of which 13  lakhs were in rural areas. This scheme also would give out loans to people at subsidized rates to make houses. It was started in 1999–2000. In 1999–2000, ₹1438.39  crore was used for this scheme, and about 7.98  lakh units were built. In 2000-01 a central outlay of ₹1710.00  crores was provided for this scheme. It improved the standard of living of rural areas: health, primary education, drinking water, housing, and roads.

The scheme has proved to be a major boost in the Indian rural population's income

To augment wage employment opportunities by employing demand and by specific guaranteed wage employment every year to households whose adult members volunteer to do unskilled manual work to thereby extend a security net to the people and simultaneously create durable assets to alleviate some aspects of poverty and address the issue of development in the rural areas.

The Ministry of Rural Development (MRD) is the nodal Ministry for the implementation of NREGA. It is responsible for ensuring timely and adequate resource support to the States and the Central Council. It has to undertake a regular review, monitoring, and evaluation of processes and outcomes. It is responsible for maintaining and operating the MIS to capture and track data on critical aspects of implementation and assess the utilization of resources through a set of performance indicators. MRD will support innovations that help in improving processes towards the achievement of the objectives of the Act. It will support the use of Information Technology (IT) to increase the efficiency and transparency of the processes as well as improve the interface with the public. It will also ensure that the implementation of NREGA at all levels is sought to be made transparent and accountable to the public. Now 100 to 150 days of work for all is provided. 

The integrated child development program is also one of the poverty alleviation programs.

References

Poverty in India